Elvis Nuh Harewan (born 15 June 1990) is an Indonesian professional footballer who plays as a midfielder for Persewar Waropen.

Club career

Cacusan CF
In February 2016, Elvis joined Cacusan CF in the 2016 Liga Futebol Amadora, he was contracted for one year with his friend while still in Persipura Jayapura, Moses Banggo and Marco Kabiay.

References

External links
 
 Elvis Harewan at Liga Indonesia

1990 births
Living people
Indonesian footballers
Liga 1 (Indonesia) players
Liga 2 (Indonesia) players
Persipura Jayapura players
Persiram Raja Ampat players
Semen Padang F.C. players
PSBS Biak Numfor players
Persewar Waropen players
Indonesian expatriate footballers
Expatriate footballers in East Timor
People from Yapen Islands Regency
Association football defenders
Sportspeople from Papua
21st-century Indonesian people